The 2011 Zagreb Open (Also known as the Pliva Zagreb Open for sponsorship reasons) was a professional tennis tournament played on outdoor red clay courts. This event was the 16th edition of the tournament and was part of the 2011 ATP Challenger Tour and 2011 ITF Women's Circuit. It took place in Zagreb, Croatia May 9–16, 2011.

ATP singles main draw entrants

Seeds

 Rankings are as of May 2, 2010.

Other entrants
The following players received wildcards into the singles main draw:
  Kristijan Mesaroš
  Thomas Muster
  Borut Puc
  Antonio Veić

The following players received entry from the qualifying draw:
  Guillermo Alcaide
  Andrea Arnaboldi
  Andrey Kuznetsov
  Nikola Mektić

WTA entrants

Seeds

 Rankings are as of May 2, 2010.

Other entrants
The following players received wildcards into the singles main draw:
  Mateja Kraljevic
  Tereza Mrdeža
  Silvia Njirić
  Donna Vekić

The following players received entry from the qualifying draw:
  Tamara Čurović
  Doroteja Erić
  Inés Ferrer-Suárez
  Michaela Hončová
  Réka-Luca Jani
  Nastja Kolar
  Katalin Marosi
  Barbara Sobaszkiewicz

Champions

Men's singles

 Diego Junqueira def.  João Souza, 6–3, 6–4

Women's singles

 Nathalie Piquion def.  Doroteja Erić, 6–3, 3–6, 6–1

Men's doubles

 Daniel Muñoz de la Nava /  Rubén Ramírez Hidalgo def.  Mate Pavić /  Franko Škugor, 6–2, 7–6(10)

Women's doubles

 Elitsa Kostova /  Barbara Sobaszkiewicz def.  Ani Mijačika /  Ana Vrljić, 1–6, 6–3, [12–10]

External links
Official website
ITF search
ATP official site

Zagreb Open
Zagreb Open
Zagreb Open
2011 in Croatian tennis